Edgecomb is a town in Lincoln County, Maine, United States. The population was 1,188 at the 2020 census. It includes the villages of East Edgecomb, North Edgecomb, and Pools Landing. The town was named for George Edgcumbe, 1st Earl of Mount Edgcumbe, a supporter of the colonists. Fort Edgecomb is a Maine State Historic Site.

Geography

History 
Although there is little industry in Edgecomb in 2018, there is a diverse and interesting history of ship building, saw mills, brick yards, farming, landing ocean harvests, rock and felspar mining operations.

Demographics

2010 census
As of the census of 2010, there were 1,249 people, 523 households, and 356 families living in the town. The racial makeup of the town was 96.2% White, 0.2% African American, 0.4% Native American, 1.5% Asian, and 1.8% from two or more races. Hispanic or Latino of any race were 0.3% of the population.

There were 523 households, of which 30.0% had children under the age of 18 living with them, 55.4% were married couples living together, 8.8% had a female householder with no husband present, 3.8% had a male householder with no wife present, and 31.9% were non-families. 26.0% of all households were made up of individuals, and 11.1% had someone living alone who was 65 years of age or older. The average household size was 2.37 and the average family size was 2.82.

The median age in the town was 46.4 years. 22.3% of residents were under the age of 18; 4.9% were between the ages of 18 and 24; 20.2% were from 25 to 44; 34.5% were from 45 to 64; and 18% were 65 years of age or older. The gender makeup of the town was 50.1% male and 49.9% female.

2000 census
As of the census of 2000, there were 1,090 people, 466 households, and 328 families living in the town. The racial makeup of the town was 98.72% White, 0.28% Native American, 0.18% Asian, and 0.83% from two or more races. Hispanic or Latino of any race were 0.09% of the population.

There were 466 households, out of which 29.8% had children under the age of 18 living with them, 60.1% were married couples living together, 6.7% had a female householder with no husband present, and 29.6% were non-families. 25.5% of all households were made up of individuals, and 12.7% had someone living alone who was 65 years of age or older. The average household size was 2.34 and the average family size was 2.78.

In the town, the population was spread out, with 23.0% under the age of 18, 3.7% from 18 to 24, 25.4% from 25 to 44, 31.5% from 45 to 64, and 16.4% who were 65 years of age or older. The median age was 44 years. For every 100 females, there were 93.6 males. For every 100 females age 18 and over, there were 93.3 males.

The median income for a household in the town was $43,833, and the median income for a family was $49,861. Males had a median income of $32,321 versus $24,474 for females. The per capita income for the town was $23,788. About 2.8% of families and 4.3% of the population were below the poverty line, including 2.0% of those under age 18 and 4.5% of those age 65 or over.

Sites of interest 

 Congregational Church of Edgecomb
 Fort Edgecomb
 John Moore House
 Stephen Parsons House

Notable people 

 Nancie Atwell, educator
 Earl Cunningham, painter
 Paul LePage, businessman and politician
 Lea Wait, novelist

References

External links
 Town of Edgecomb, Maine
 Maine.gov Profile
 Epodunk Profile 
Edgecomb Historical web site http://www.edgecombhistorical.org

Towns in Lincoln County, Maine
Towns in Maine